Pawan Kumar Kedia is an Indian politician and a member of 17th Legislative Assembly of Uttar Pradesh of India. He represents the Hata (Assembly constituency) in Kushinagar district of Uttar Pradesh and is a member of the Bhartiya Janata Party.

Early life and education
Kedia was born 1 December 1965 in Hata, Kushinagar district of Uttar Pradesh to his father Sitaram Kedia. He married Amita Kedia in 1991, they have a son. He belongs to Vaishya community. He got M.Com. degree from Gorakhpur University in 1990.

Political career
Kedia started his political journey as Head of Department (HOD) of Rashtriya Swayamsevak Sangh and Vishva Hindu Parishad from 1994 to 2010. In 16th Legislative Assembly of Uttar Pradesh (2012) elections, he contested from Hata (Assembly constituency) as an Independent politician, but lost to SP's Radheshyam Singh and stood on sixth with 8,914 (4.81℅) votes.

In 17th Legislative Assembly of Uttar Pradesh (2017) elections, he got ticket by Bharatiya Janata Party from Hata. He was elected MLA by defeating Samajwadi Party candidate Radheshyam Singh by a margin of 53,076 votes.

Posts held

References

Bharatiya Janata Party politicians from Uttar Pradesh
People from Kushinagar district
Living people
Uttar Pradesh MLAs 2017–2022
1965 births